Wrestling competitions at the 2007 Pan American Games in Rio de Janeiro was held from July 14 to July 18 at the Riocentro Complex.

Medal table

Men's events

Men's Freestyle

Men's Greco-Roman

Women's events

Women's Freestyle

References

P
Events at the 2007 Pan American Games
2007
Wrestling in Brazil